The Big Empty is a 2003 comedy film directed and written by Steve Anderson. It stars Jon Favreau as a struggling actor with a bizarre request from his neighbor to deliver a suitcase that he cannot open. While there, he meets an unusual cast of characters, and starts to think this delivery might be more than it seems.

Plot

John Person (stage name), struggling actor in LA, is in debt $28,000. His friend Grace, lives across the hall. One night, their neighbor Neely, in a neck brace, invades his apartment with an unusual offer: deliver a blue suitcase to a truck stop in Baker, California to "Cowboy", for $25,000. He gets a gun to protect the case. Initially refusing, as it seems insane, Neely has lots of his very personal information, including masturbation preferences and sperm sample test results. Realizing he's serious, John takes the job, but demands $28,000 to pay off his debts, and Neely agrees.

Checking into the Royal Hawaiian Motel in Baker, John finds out he just missed "Cowboy", described as wearing a "big, stupid black duster and Stetson". Going nearby for a drink, he's immediately held at gunpoint by the hot-tempered Randy, who thinks John is after his girlfriend Ruthie. She comes to John's room later, giving him his wallet that he dropped in the bar, and they hit it off.

In a diner the next day, John meets Dan, who tells a lot of strange tales and conspiracy theories about what goes on in the desert. Later, John meets Ruthie outside a gas station and buys her beer, Jack Daniel's, and a can of whipped cream. Then, they drive to Devil's Crest lakebed far out of town. He hears more stories about RVs and people "disappear without a trace" there. They get drunk, mostly on a mixture of Jack Daniel's and whipped cream. Ruthie gets sick and passes out, so John drives her home to her mother Stella's bar.

Going back to the motel, John has missed Cowboy again. He left him a bowling ball bag he is not allowed to open, with Neely's name on it. Grace calls to tell him Neely was murdered, and FBI agent Banks is looking for him. Neely was shot, beheaded, and the head is missing. John immediately fears the head is in the bag, but isn't sure, as he cannot open it.

Candy, a hooker, comes to John's room, as she heard he is meeting Cowboy. She warns him, as she heard rumors about Cowboy and three strippers from Las Vegas who disappeared. She describes Cowboy's black duster and Stetson, and John immediately becomes wary. Later on, Randy confronts him, asking what they did at Devil's Crest, threatening to kill him if he talks to Ruthie again.

The next day, John buries the bag and later, at the bar, Stella reveals she is not really Ruthie's mother. She found her wandering around the dry lake bed at Devil's Crest when she was only two. FBI agent Banks is at the bar, and tries to link him to Neely's murder and 75 mysterious disappearances from Baker.

John sees Randy has stolen his suitcase so, he drives to the junkyard, with his gun, finding Randy has tied Ruthie up. The men have an armed standoff, but John convinces Randy to let Ruthie and him go by threatening to shoot her. Later, Ruthie comes to John's room to tell him Randy was arrested, and they make love.

Later that night, Randy orders John to drive to the desert at gunpoint and dig a grave. Once finished, Randy is about to shoot him, but Cowboy shoots Randy. Going back to the motel, John finds more suitcases stacked in his room. Cowboy tells him to drive them to the Devil's Crest lakebed. When John refuses, he forces him to do it by holding Grace hostage. John goes to Devil's Crest and meets Bob the Indian, who tells him where and how to arrange the suitcases, and leaves.

Cowboy arrives in an RV with a group in blue tracksuits, similar to Neely's. One of them is Ruthie. Cowboy opens the bowling bag, pulling out a pair of size-11 bowling shoes. Offering them to John, as a chance to "come with him" to Paradise, he refuses. So, Cowboy gives them to barefooted Ruthie. John asks her why, she excitedly invites him to come too, but he declines. Cowboy shoots a flare into the air. John warily asks what the Cowboy is, and is told he is simply a cowboy, even as his skin begins to turn blue and translucent. As the flare explodes, John blacks out.

John wakes up alone on the dry lakebed. All of the suitcases are open and empty, except for a locked one nearby. Frustrated, he takes it, and begins the long walk over sand dunes to the highway. Grace meets him, and says he has been missing for three days. She gives him a key from Cowboy and he opens the case to find his $28,000.

Back in LA, Agent Banks interrogates John about what happened in Baker, who attributes the 75 disappearances to Cowboy. He can't tell this to the families of those disappeared. He then tells John that his credit card debts were paid off with money unrelated to the $28,000, which he says John won in Vegas. Perhaps he believes John's story, then John sees a band-aid on Banks' neck, similar to the one that appeared on his own neck after his Devil's Crest, relating to one of Dan's conspiracy theories.

Sometime later, John and Grace are on a date at a bowling alley. She congratulates him for getting a supporting role in a movie, showing his acting prospects are improving. She then repeats Cowboy's line about starting a new game, and her eyes are bright blue. John, wearing size-11 shoes, remarks she looks different, before he rolls a ball down the alley; his eyes turn bright blue too. The bowling ball is then shown rolling across the vast moonlit Devil's Crest. Far in the distance white flames, like the Cowboy's flare, rise from the desert floor.

Cast

 Jon Favreau as John Person; an out-of-work actor, and the story's protagonist. He keeps waiting for callbacks from "promising auditions" and hangs a number of his headshots on the wall wherever he goes. He is like the story's everyman, reacting rather seriously and deadpan to his situations. John Person is his stage name, and his real name is never revealed. His favorite drink is a gin and tonic.
 Joey Lauren Adams as Grace; John's friend, who lives across the hall from him. She is slightly nerdy, but is cheery and supportive of John's acting career.
 Bud Cort as Neely; John's strange neighbor. He is stocky and squirrely, and wears a neck brace for an unknown reason (John and Grace gossip about why he is wearing it). He is the one who convinces John Person to deliver the suitcase to Baker, California. John finds him rather creepy, and Neely somehow knows more than he should about John. 
 Jon Gries as Elron; the manager of the Royal Hawaiian Motel in Baker. He is irritatingly peppy and offers John a complimentary hooker and comes into his motel room every morning to wake him up and offer him breakfast. John usually refuses and Elron usually sits in the room and eats them himself. Later,  he is found to have a steel plate in his head.
 Daryl Hannah as Stella; the bartender at the local bar. She is an easygoing, urbane woman who helps John out.
 Rachael Leigh Cook as Ruthie; Stella's adopted daughter. She is somewhat of a "bad girl", with a high alcohol tolerance and a heavily opinionated attitude, but she also has a sweet side. She wants to leave Baker to see the world, and is attracted to John's good and supportive nature.
 Adam Beach as Randy; Ruthie's boyfriend. He has an obsession with Ruthie, and reacts violently if anyone so much as looks at her. He is psychopathic and threatens to kill John, first with a chainsaw and later with a shotgun.
 Brent Briscoe as Dan; a trucker who is always at the diner with John Person, and rambles on about conspiracy theories such as how the government is building a bullet train so "they can get people liquored up and fire them out into the desert" so they do not notice the numerous UFO sightings around Baker. Some of his conspiracy theories turn out to offer interesting insights on the story's details.
 Sean Bean as Cowboy; a mysterious person to whom John Person needs to deliver the suitcase. Cowboy is only alluded to for most of the movie as "the guy with a big, black duster and black Stetson". He is a classic cowboy (despite his English accent) with a gravelly voice and tough attitude. His role, though, is much more strange; his job is to gather up people to be taken away by aliens at a "jump point" outside Baker.
 Kelsey Grammer as Agent Banks; an FBI agent who suspects John has a role in the unusual occurrences in Baker. He has a certain fast-talking wit and grandiosity about himself, possibly for the use of "good cop" interrogation. He may also have been involved in what is going on in Baker.
 Gary Farmer as Indian Bob; a sarcastic Native American who guides John Person to the "jump point" in the dry lake bed, instructs him what to do, and offers him homespun wisdom about making the most out of life.
 Melora Walters as Candy; a hooker who works for the motel where John Person is staying, as a complimentary service to the guests. She is a bit of an airhead, but she offers important information about Cowboy's motives.

Locations

The Big Empty was all shot on location in Los Angeles and Baker, California, which is a real town in southern California where most of the story takes place. Many of its locations are real, including the Royal Hawaiian Motel. Several landmarks in Baker are also shown, including the world's tallest thermometer.
The Alto Nido apartments where John Person is living are the same ones where William Holden lived in the beginning of Sunset Blvd.  All the bowling scenes were filmed at the famous Hollywood Star Lanes in Hollywood. It has since been demolished.

Reception 
On Rotten Tomatoes the film has an approval rating of 71% based on reviews from 7 critics.

Kevin Thomas of the Los Angeles Times gave the film a positive review, saying it "Has a seductive easiness (which may not be for everyone, but it works), a laid-back yet ever-so-slightly portentous score and a wonderful sense of place." Chuck Wilson of L.A. Weekly wrote: "More amiable than laugh-out-loud funny, the film pokes along, buoyed by the motel's bright Hawaiian color scheme, and a moonlit desert finale that's awfully pretty." Robert Koehler of Variety wrote: ""Hobbled by uninspired stabs at cleverness and surreal narrative curlicues, The Big Empty goes nowhere, replete with a question mark of an ending that isn't worth answering."

References

External links
 
 

2003 films
2003 independent films
2000s science fiction comedy films
American independent films
American science fiction comedy films
Films scored by Brian Tyler
Films about actors
Films set in California
2003 comedy films
2000s English-language films
2000s American films